Francis Leslie may refer to:

Francis Leslie (pirate) (fl. 1717-1718), pirate active in the Caribbean

See also
Francis Leslie Ashton (1904–1994), British writer
Francis Leslie Pym (1922–2008), British politician
Francis Leslie Rose (1909–1988), British chemist
Frank Leslie (disambiguation)
Leslie Francis, American philosopher